The Australian Department of Communications and the Arts was a department of the Government of Australia charged with responsibility for communications policy and programs and cultural affairs.

In December 2019, prime minister Scott Morrison announced that the department would be merged into a new "mega department", the new Department of Infrastructure, Transport, Regional Development and Communications. In response to criticism from the arts sector, Paul Fletcher, Minister for Communications and the Arts said that the merger was merely administrative and would not result in budget cuts.

History
The department was created in September 2015 following Malcolm Turnbull becoming prime minister, replacing the Department of Communications, and transferring responsibility for the arts from the Attorney-General's Department.

Preceding departments
Postmaster-General's Department (1 January 1901 – 22 December 1975)
Department of the Media (19 December 1972 – 22 December 1975)
Postal and Telecommunications Department (22 December 1975 – 3 November 1980)
Department of Communications (3 November 1980 – 24 July 1987)
Department of Transport and Communications (24 July 1987 – 23 December 1993)
Department of Communications (23 December 1993 – 30 January 1994)
Department of Communications and the Arts (30 January 1994 – 21 October 1998)
Department of Communications, Information Technology and the Arts (21 October 1998 – 3 December 2007)
Department of Broadband, Communications and the Digital Economy (3 December 2007 – 18 September 2013)
Department of Communications (18 September 2013 – 21 September 2015)

Operational functions
The Administrative Arrangements Order made on 21 September 2015 detailed the following responsibilities to the department:
 Broadband policy and programs
 Postal and telecommunications policies and programs
 Spectrum policy management
 Broadcasting policy
 National policy issues relating to the digital economy
 Content policy relating to the information economy
 Classification
 Copyright
 Cultural affairs, including movable cultural heritage and support for the arts
 As part of this function, the department administers a programme relating to the return of Aboriginal Australian human remains and cultural objects, the International Repatriation Program (IRP). This programme "supports the repatriation of ancestral remains and secret sacred objects to their communities of origin to help promote healing and reconciliation" and assists community representatives work towards repatriation of remains in various ways.

Language revival project

, the department is funding the Priority Languages Support Project, being undertaken by First Languages Australia. The project aims to "identify and document critically-endangered languages – those languages for which little or no documentation exists, where no recordings have previously been made, but where there are living speakers". It has so far prioritised 20 languages

See also

 Minister for Communications
 List of Australian Commonwealth Government entities

Notes

References 

Australia, Communications and the Arts
Australia
Australian culture
2015 establishments in Australia
2020 disestablishments in Australia
Defunct government departments of Australia